Amazing Grace and Chuck is a 1987 American drama film directed by Mike Newell and starring William Petersen, Jamie Lee Curtis and Gregory Peck. It was released on VHS in the UK as Silent Voice.

The film's release came in a critical historical context, amid the deterioration of United States-Soviet Union relations, escalation of hostile political rhetoric and deepening public concern about the nuclear threat in the 1980s. The film was released one month before Soviet General Secretary Mikhail Gorbachev announced the perestroika reforms.

Plot
Chuck Murdock (Joshua Zuehlke), a 12-year-old boy from Montana and the son of a military jet pilot, becomes anxious after seeing a Minuteman missile on a school field trip, which is intensified by a nightmare of a fork dropping after being told that the speed and effectiveness would be done "before a dropped fork hits the floor". Chuck protests the existence of nuclear weapons by refusing to play baseball, which results in the forfeit of a Little League game by his team.

"Amazing Grace" Smith, a fictional Boston Celtics player (played by NBA star Alex English), catches a blurb about the story in his newspaper and decides to emulate Chuck, saying he will no longer participate in professional basketball unless there are no more nuclear weapons. This gives it nationwide coverage, inspiring more pro athletes to join the protest against nuclear weapons. Smith then moves to Montana to meet with Chuck and buys an old barn, which he and the other athletes renovate into their residence. Smith's agent, Lynn (Jamie Lee Curtis) is unsure about what he hopes to accomplish but decides to support him and Chuck.

The film reaches a climax when the President of the United States (Gregory Peck) personally meets with Chuck, admiring his resolve but at the same time explaining the practical difficulties of disarmament.

Cast
 Alex English as Amazing Grace Smith
 Joshua Zuehlke as Chuck Murdock
 Jamie Lee Curtis as Lynn Taylor
 William Petersen as Russell Murdock
 Gregory Peck as President
 Lee Richardson as Jeffries
 Red Auerbach as himself
 Alan Autry as George
 Michael Bowen as Hot Dog
 Frances Conroy as Pamela
 Dean Alexander as Sports Broadcaster
 Jim Allen as Missile Soldier

References

External links
 
 
 

1987 films
1980s sports drama films
American baseball films
American basketball films
American sports drama films
1980s English-language films
Films scored by Elmer Bernstein
Films about fictional presidents of the United States
Films about nuclear war and weapons
Films directed by Mike Newell
Films set in Montana
Films shot in Montana
TriStar Pictures films
1987 drama films
1980s American films